This is a list of the National Register of Historic Places listings in Smith County, Texas.

This is intended to be a complete list of properties and districts listed on the National Register of Historic Places in Smith County, Texas. There are seven districts and 28 individual properties listed on the National Register in the county. Three individually listed properties are State Antiquities Landmarks two of which, along with six others, are Recorded Texas Historic Landmarks. Three districts contain additional Recorded Texas Historic Landmarks.

Current listings

The locations of National Register properties and districts may be seen in a mapping service provided.

|}

See also

National Register of Historic Places listings in Texas
Recorded Texas Historic Landmarks in Smith County

References

External links

Registered Historic Places
Smith County
Buildings and structures in Smith County, Texas